Aleksandr Kovalenko may refer to:

 Aleksandr Kovalenko (athlete) (born 1963), Belarusian triple jumper
 Alexandr Covalenco (born 1978), Moldovan football defender
 Alexander Kovalenko (canoeist) (born 1986), Russian sprint canoeist
 Aleksandr Kovalenko (footballer) (born 2003), Russian football midfielder for Krylia Sovetov Samara